Lee Yoo-hyung (Hangul: 이유형, 21 January 1911 – 29 January 2003) was a Korean football player and manager. He has played for Japan national team and South Korea national team. He was part of South Korea's squad for the 1948 Summer Olympics, but he did not play in any matches. He also played Kyungsung FC. He started coaching career before the Korean War. After the war, he managed South Korea national football team several times.

National team statistics

Honors

Manager
South Korea
 AFC Asian Cup winner : 1956

References

External links
 
 Japan National Football Team Database

1911 births
2003 deaths
Japanese footballers
South Korean footballers
Japan international footballers
South Korea international footballers
South Korean football managers
Olympic footballers of South Korea
Footballers at the 1948 Summer Olympics
Dual internationalists (football)
South Korea national football team managers
AFC Asian Cup-winning managers
Kyungsung FC players
1956 AFC Asian Cup managers
1964 AFC Asian Cup managers
Association football midfielders
People from Sinchon County